Nataliya Aleksandrovna Yukhareva (born 17 September 1975 in Saint Petersburg) is a Russian judoka who competed in the women's lightweight category. She held a 2007 Russian senior title for her own division, picked up a total of seventeen medals in her career, including a bronze from the European Championships, and finished seventh in the 57-kg class at the 2004 Summer Olympics. Throughout most of her sporting career, Yukhareva trained as a full-fledged member of the judo squad for SKA St. Petersburg, under her personal coach, father, and sensei Sergey Yukharev.

Career 
Yukhareva qualified for the Russian squad in the women's lightweight class (57 kg) at the 2004 Summer Olympics in Athens, by placing third from the European Championships in Bucharest, Romania. She got off to a rough start with a sudden-death defeat from North Korean judoka and 1996 Olympic champion Kye Sun-hui in the prelims. With her opponent moving further into the final, Yukhareva permitted herself a chance for an Olympic bronze medal by immediately clutching Malta's Marcon Bezzina and Great Britain's Sophie Cox in the repechage round, but fell short to France's Barbara Harel by a double yuko and a seoi nage (shoulder throw) in their subsequent match, relegating Yukhareva into the seventh position.

References

External links
 
 
 InfoSport.ru Profile

1975 births
Living people
Russian female judoka
Olympic judoka of Russia
Judoka at the 2004 Summer Olympics
Sportspeople from Saint Petersburg
21st-century Russian women